Esperanza is a Spanish feminine given name, meaning "hope" or "expectation".

List of people with the given name Esperanza
 Esperanza Aguirre (born 1952), Aristocrat and president of the Spanish autonomous community of Madrid since 2003
 Esperanza Andrade (born 1949), Secretary of State of Texas
 Esperanza Baur (1920–1961), Mexican actress and second wife of John Wayne
 Esperanza Cabral, current Secretary of the Department of Social Welfare and Development in the Philippines
 Esperanza Guisán, Spanish philosopher
 Esperanza Malchi (died 1600), economic agent of the Valide Sultan Safiye
 Esperanza Martinez (1934–1998), Mexican painter
 Esperanza Osmeña (1896–1978), second wife of Philippine President Sergio Osmeña and is considered the fourth First Lady of the Philippines
 Esperanza Roy (born 1935),  Spanish actress
 Esperanza Spalding (born 1984), American multi-instrumentalist best known as a jazz bassist, singer and composer

References

Feminine given names
Spanish feminine given names